The 2007 Formula Nippon Championship was  contested over 9 rounds. 12 different teams, 22 different drivers competed. All teams had to use Lola chassis (Lola FN06) and use either a Mugen Honda (Mugen HF386E) or Toyota (Toyota RV8J) engine.

Teams and drivers

Race calendar and results

All races were held in Japan.

Notes:

 Tony Kanaan participated as a special entry under the authorization of JAF with no points to be scored.
 Okayama replaced Autopolis.

Championship standings

Drivers' Championship
Scoring system

Teams' Championship

External links
2007 Japanese Championship Formula Nippon

Formula Nippon
Super Formula
Nippon